Pentatomini is a tribe of shield bugs in the subfamily of Pentatominae.

Genera 
 Acrosternum Fieber, 1860

 Arvelius Spinola, 1840
 Banasa Stål 1860
 Brepholoxa Van Duzee, 1904
 Chinavia Orian, 1965
 Chlorochroa Stål 1872
 Chlorocoris Spinola, 1837
 Codophila Mulsant and Rey, 1866
 Coenus Dallas, 1851

 Cyptocephala Berg, 1883
 Dendrocoris Bergroth, 1891
 Euschistus Dallas, 1851
 Holcostethus Fieber, 1860
 Hymenarcys Amyot and Serville, 1843
 Kermana Rolston and Mcdonald, 1981
 Loxa Amyot & Serville 1843
 Menecles Stål 1867
 Mormidea Amyot and Serville, 1843
 Moromorpha Rolston, 1978
 Murgantia Stål 1862
 Neopharnus Van Duzee, 1910
 Neottiglossa Kirby, 1837
 Nezara Amyot and Serville, 1843
 Odmalea Bergroth, 1915
 Oebalus Stål 1862
 Padaeus Stål 1862
 Pentatoma Olivier, 1789
 Pellaea Stål 1872
 Piezodorus Fieber, 1860
 Prionosoma Uhler, 1863
 Runibia Stål 1861
 Tepa Rolston and Mcdonald, 1984
 Thyanta Stål 1860
 Trichopepla Stål 1867
 Vulsirea Spinola 1837

References

External links 
 
 

 
Pentatominae
Hemiptera tribes